Bordeaux mixture (also called Bordo Mix) is a mixture of copper(II) sulphate (CuSO4) and quicklime (CaO) used as a fungicide. It is used in vineyards, fruit-farms and gardens to prevent infestations of downy mildew, powdery mildew and other fungi. It is sprayed on plants as a preventive treatment; its mode of action is ineffective after a fungus has become established. It was invented in the Bordeaux region of France in the late 19th century. If it is applied in large quantities annually for many years, the copper in the mixture eventually becomes a pollutant. As such its sale and use is illegal in Great Britain and most of the European Union. Despite this, it has been promoted as an 'organic' pesticide.

Main uses
In addition to its use to control fungal infection on grape vines, the mixture is also widely used to control potato blight, peach leaf curl and apple scab. Although it may be bad for the environment, some organic agriculture advocates allow its use, so is often used by organic gardeners in some parts of the world.

Because the copper ions build up in the soil, continuous use will cause heavy metal pollution. Copper also bioaccumulates in organisms. It is thus illegal to use in most European Union countries, with the exception of Belgium, Cyprus, France, Greece, Hungary, Italy, Malta, Portugal, Romania and Slovenia.

Mode of action
Bordeaux mixture achieves its effect by means of the copper ions (Cu2+) of the mixture. These ions affect enzymes in the fungal spores in such a way as to prevent germination. This means Bordeaux mixture must be used preventively, before the fungal disease has struck.

Thorough coverage of the spray on the plants is necessary. The Bordeaux spray continues to adhere well to the plant during rain, though in the long term it is washed off by rain. Commonly in practice, it is applied just once a year, in the wintertime.

Preparation

Bordeaux mixture can be prepared using differing proportions of the components. In preparing it, the CuSO4 and the lime are dissolved separately in water and then mixed. Calcium oxide (burnt lime) and calcium hydroxide (slaked lime) give the same end result, since an excess of water is used in the preparation.

The conventional method of describing the mixture's composition is to give the weight of CuSO4, the weight of hydrated lime and the volume of water, in that order. The percentage of the weight of CuSO4 to the weight of water employed determines the concentration of the mixture. Thus a 1% Bordeaux mixture, which is typical, would have the formula 1:1:100, with the first "1" representing 1 kg CuSO4 (pentahydrated), the second representing 1 kg hydrated lime, and the 100 representing 100 litres (100 kg) water. As CuSO4 contains 25% copper, the copper content of a 1% Bordeaux mixture would be 0.25%. The quantity of lime used can be lower than that of the CuSO4. One kg of CuSO4 actually requires only 0.225 kg of chemically pure hydrated lime to precipitate all the copper. Good proprietary brands of hydrated lime are now freely available, but, as even these deteriorate on storage (by absorbing carbon dioxide from the air), a ratio of less than 2:1 is seldom used, which corresponds to a 1:0.5:100 mixture.

Risks

Bordeaux mixture has been found to be harmful to fish, livestock and—due to potential buildup of copper in the soil—earthworms.

The chemical was in use as a blight preventive in the potato country of northern Maine by 1921. It started to be used by the United Fruit Company throughout Latin America around 1922. The mixture was nicknamed perico, or "parakeet", because it would turn workers completely blue. Many workers would get sick or die of poisoning due to the  toxic chemical.

History

In the 19th century, several outbreaks of vine diseases occurred among the Vitis vinifera vines of the classical European wine regions.  These outbreaks were caused by pests to which these vines lacked resistance, carried on vines brought to Europe as botanical specimens of American origin.  These pests included not only the Great French Wine Blight caused by the aphid Phylloxera vastatrix, but also mildew and other diseases caused by fungi.

After the downy mildew had struck, botany professor Pierre-Marie-Alexis Millardet of the University of Bordeaux studied the disease in vineyards of the Bordeaux region. Millardet then noted that vines closest to the roads did not show mildew, while all other vines were affected. After inquiries, he found out those vines had been sprayed with a mixture of CuSO4 and lime to deter passersby from eating the grapes, since this treatment was both visible and bitter-tasting. This led Millardet to conduct trials with this treatment. The trials primarily took place in the vineyards of Château Dauzac, where he was assisted by Ernest David, Dauzac's technical director. Millardet published his findings in 1878, and recommended the mixture to combat downy mildew.

In France, the use of Bordeaux mixture has also been known as the Millardet-David treatment.

See also 
 Burgundy mixture
 Phytopathology

Notes

References

External links
ABC Gardening Australia Fact Sheet
Bordeaux Mixture at the UC Statewide Integrated Pest Management Program, University of California

Fungicides